The Matrix Resurrections is a 2021 American science fiction action film produced, co-written, and directed by Lana Wachowski, and being the first in Matrix franchise to be directed solely by Lana, without her sister, Lilly. It is the sequel to The Matrix Revolutions (2003) and the fourth installment in The Matrix film franchise. The film stars Keanu Reeves, Carrie-Anne Moss, Yahya Abdul-Mateen II (who replaces Laurence Fishburne), Jessica Henwick, Jonathan Groff (who replaces Hugo Weaving), Neil Patrick Harris, Priyanka Chopra Jonas, Christina Ricci, and Jada Pinkett Smith. The film is set sixty years after Revolutions and follows Neo, who lives a seemingly ordinary life as a video game developer having trouble with distinguishing fantasy from reality. A group of rebels, with the help of a programmed version of Morpheus, free Neo from a new version of the Matrix and fight a new enemy that holds Trinity captive.

Following the release of Revolutions, the Wachowskis denied the possibility of another Matrix film. Warner Bros. constantly expressed interest in reviving the franchise, hiring Zak Penn to write a new screenplay after the Wachowskis refused every offer to create more sequels. In late 2019, a fourth Matrix film was finally announced, with Lana Wachowski returning as director without her sister Lilly, and with Reeves and Moss reprising their roles. Filming started in February 2020 but was halted the next month by the COVID-19 pandemic. Wachowski considered abandoning the film, but was encouraged by the cast to finish it. Filming resumed in August and concluded three months later.

The Matrix Resurrections premiered at Castro Theater in San Francisco on December 16, 2021, and was released theatrically and via the HBO Max streaming service by Warner Bros. Pictures on December 22, 2021. The film was a box-office disappointment, grossing $159 million worldwide on a production budget of $190 million. Critics praised the performances of the cast (particularly Reeves and Moss), action sequences, musical score, direction, visual effects, and the film's ambition in storytelling, though criticism was aimed at its writing and the recasting of several actors, namely Fishburne and Weaving. It received a nomination for Best Visual Effects at the 75th British Academy Film Awards.

Plot 
Thomas Anderson is the creator of a video game series called The Matrix, based on his faint memories as Neo. At a coffee shop, he keeps crossing paths with Tiffany, a married mother with no recollection of her past, on which Anderson based the game character Trinity. He struggles to separate perceived reality from dreams. His therapist prescribes him blue pills to suppress the occurrences, which he stops taking. Anderson creates a simulation to develop game characters. A young woman named Bugs learns the simulation is running old code in a loop, enacting the moment when Trinity first found Neo within the Matrix. Bugs discovers a program embodying Morpheus, and helps free him.

Having deduced that Neo is alive, Bugs and Morpheus extract him from the Matrix; meanwhile, Anderson's business partner Smith regains his memories as Agent Smith, Neo's former nemesis. Neo awakens in a pod and notices Trinity confined in another one nearby, before being extracted to Bugs's hovercraft Mnemosyne. Neo is brought to the human city Io, where he reunites with an elderly Niobe. She explains that sixty years have passed in the real world since the Machine War ended, and that Neo's allies have died over time, including the original Morpheus. The peace achieved by Neo's sacrifice lasted for many years, but the large number of humans leaving the Matrix created a serious power shortage, causing the machines to fight over limited resources.

Zion was destroyed, though most of its people relocated to Io with the aid of sympathetic machines. She says she won't risk Io to help him free Trinity, and has him locked in his quarters. Bugs and her crewmates free Neo and enter the Matrix to contact Trinity, where they are intercepted by Smith and other exiled programs, including the Merovingian. They attack, but Neo and the Mnemosyne crew defeat them as Neo's abilities return. They leave and locate Trinity, but before Neo can talk to her, his therapist appears and immobilizes him by manipulating time. He reveals his identity as the Analyst, a program designed to study the human psyche. He explains that after Neo and Trinity's deaths, he was tasked with studying Neo's body and his anomalous powers as The One - convincing his superiors to resurrect both of them.

Analyst found that due to The One's inherent connection to all humanity in the Matrix, manipulating Neo could actually make the Matrix produce more energy. Moreover, he discovered that the code anomaly in Neo was actually shared in his bond with Trinity. By suppressing both their memories and keeping them close but always apart, the Matrix generated much more energy. Solving the energy crisis put the Analyst in a position to seize power from the Architect, after which he rebuilt the Matrix to control humans with emotional manipulation - citing that humans generally believe what they want to believe, but Neo's liberation destabilized the system and triggered a fail-safe to reboot the Matrix.

The Analyst stalled the reboot by convincing his superiors that threatening to kill Trinity would get Neo to return voluntarily to his pod. Neo and Bugs return to Io and talk to Sati, an exile program he previously met. Seeking to avenge her parents' deaths at the hands of the machines, Sati helps devise a plan to free Trinity. Back in the Matrix, Neo makes a deal with the Analyst; he will return to his pod if he fails to convince Trinity to leave the Matrix. Tiffany reaffirms her identity as Trinity while talking with Neo. Realizing that he has lost, the Analyst attempts to kill her, but Smith appears and attacks the Analyst, seeking revenge for his own imprisonment.

Neo, Trinity, and the others escape in their vehicles, but are chased through the streets by hordes of "bot" programs and attack helicopters. As the last ones to be extracted, Neo and Trinity become cornered atop a skyscraper. Holding hands, they leap off and Trinity begins to fly, taking them to safety. With Trinity's newfound control over the Matrix, both return to confront the Analyst. They sarcastically thank him for giving them a second chance by resurrecting them, which they intend to use to remake the Matrix as they see fit. Neo and Trinity then triumphantly fly off into the sky together.

Cast

 Keanu Reeves as Neo / Thomas Anderson: The prophesied "One" from the previous version of the Matrix, Neo has been repaired by the machines and reinserted into a new version of the Matrix, with his memories suppressed in order to keep him under control. Despite sixty years having taken place since Neo's sacrifice, Neo has only aged twenty years thanks to the machines' modifications to his body. Steven Roy plays the embodiment of the original Neo, in reflections and various additional scenes.
 Carrie-Anne Moss as Trinity / Tiffany: Neo's romantic interest who was freed from the Matrix by Morpheus in the first film, and killed at the end of the Machine War. The machines recover, repair and modify her body and reinsert her into a new version of the Matrix. As with Neo, her memories of her previous life are suppressed by the machines and she becomes Tiffany, a suburban mother-of-three with a penchant for motorcycles. Despite sixty years having passed since her death, Trinity has only aged twenty years thanks to the machines' modifications to her body.
 Yahya Abdul-Mateen II as Morpheus / Agent Smith: A program created as part of a model by Neo who takes on traits of the original Morpheus, the hacker who originally freed him from the Matrix, as well as aspects of Neo's nemesis, Agent Smith. The character was portrayed by Laurence Fishburne in the previous films; Fishburne's version of the character appears through the use of archive footage.
 Jessica Henwick as Bugs: A gunslinger with a White Rabbit tattoo, and captain of the hovercraft Mnemosyne. Henwick describes her character as "the audience's eyes".
 Jonathan Groff as Smith: Thomas' business partner and Neo's former arch-nemesis and Agent of the Matrix. The character was portrayed by Hugo Weaving in the previous films; Weaving also appears as Smith through the use of archive footage. To prepare for the role, Groff watched YouTube clips featuring Weaving's performance, rewatched the original trilogy and read Mary Shelley's Frankenstein, works of Philip K. Dick and Christopher Isherwood's The Berlin Stories, though he did not want to do an impression of Weaving, feeling more connected to the role during the fight sequences. As a result of his dedication during training for such sequences, Groff was nicknamed "The Savage" by a member of the stunt team.
 Neil Patrick Harris as the Analyst: The creator of the current iteration of the Matrix, who masquerades as Thomas' therapist, working closely with his patient to understand the meaning behind his dreams and to distinguish them from "reality" while keeping him within the Matrix.
 Priyanka Chopra Jonas as Sati: An exile program created without a purpose who met Neo shortly before the end of the Machine War. The character was portrayed by Tanveer K. Atwal in The Matrix Revolutions.
 Christina Ricci as Gwyn de Vere: A business executive at Thomas' video game company.
 Jada Pinkett Smith as Niobe: A General of the human bastion Io and former captain of the hovercraft Logos. Smith reprises her role from the previous two films. It took five hours to apply Smith's prosthetic makeup to create the appearance that her character had aged 60 years.
 Telma Hopkins as Freya: The head of botany in Io.
 Chad Stahelski as Chad: Tiffany's husband. Stahelski was Keanu Reeves' stunt double, as well as a stunt coordinator, for the previous films.
 Lambert Wilson as The Merovingian: A self-professed trafficker of information who encountered Neo prior to the end of the Machine War; he now seeks revenge on Neo for inadvertently stripping him of his purpose when the previous Matrix was destroyed. Wilson reprises his role from the previous two films.
 Brian J. Smith as Berg: A crew member of the Mnemosyne who has studied Neo.
 Toby Onwumere as Sequoia: The operator of the Mnemosyne.
 Max Riemelt as Sheperd: Niobe's most-trusted captain at Io.
 Eréndira Ibarra as Lexy: A crew member of the Mnemosyne who idolizes Trinity.
 Freema Agyeman as Astra

Additionally, Andrew Lewis Caldwell and Ellen Hollman appear as Jude and Echo, respectively. Julian Grey and Gaige Chat also appear as Tiffany's sons Brandon and Donnie, respectively. San Francisco mayor London Breed appears as Calliope, a member of Resistance. Daniel Bernhardt was announced to be reprising his role as Agent Johnson from The Matrix Reloaded, but his scenes were cut from the final film. Tom Hardy filmed an uncredited background cameo appearance, due to The Matrix Resurrections filming in San Francisco simultaneously with Venom: Let There Be Carnage, in which Hardy starred as Eddie Brock / Venom.

Production

Development
{{quote box|width=33%|align=left|quote=I couldn't have my mom and dad... yet suddenly I had Neo and Trinity, arguably the two most important characters in my life. It was immediately comforting to have these two characters alive again, and it's super-simple. You can look at it and say: "Okay, these two people die, and okay, bring these two people back to life, and oh, doesn't that feel good?" Yeah, it did! It's simple, and this is what art does and this is what stories do. They comfort us and they're important.|source=The origins of The Matrix Resurrections''' story, as described by director Lana Wachowski
}}
While making the Matrix films, the Wachowskis told their close collaborators that they, at the time, had no intention of making another film in the series after The Matrix Revolutions (2003). Instead, they gave their blessing to the notion of gamers "inherit[ing] the storyline", and The Matrix Online video game was billed as the official continuation. Rumors of a new installment began to circulate online in 2011 when it was reported that the Wachowskis had been planning two additional films in the series and had discussions with Keanu Reeves about reprising his role. Another rumor in 2014 claimed that the sisters had submitted a story treatment for a new Matrix trilogy to Warner Bros. These were later confirmed to be false.

In February 2015, in interviews promoting Jupiter Ascending (2015), Lilly Wachowski called a return to The Matrix (1999) a "particularly repelling idea in these times" when studios preferred to green-light sequels, reboots, and adaptations over original material, while Lana Wachowski, addressing rumors about a potential reboot, said they had not heard anything but believed the studio might be looking to replace them. At various times, Reeves and Hugo Weaving each confirmed their interest and willingness to reprise their roles in potential future installments of the Matrix films, with the stipulation that the Wachowskis were involved in the creative and production process.

According to producer James McTeigue, there was "always talk" of a fourth Matrix film within Warner Bros. even without the Wachowskis on board, though prior to 2019 they had not found the right concept. In March 2017, The Hollywood Reporter wrote that Warner Bros. was in the early stages of developing a relaunch of the franchise, with Zak Penn in talks to write a treatment, and interest in getting Michael B. Jordan attached to star. The Wachowskis were not involved at that stage, although the studio had hoped for their blessing. The notion of a reboot or remake was denounced by Penn, and ideas for stories set in the already established universe were explored, including, reportedly, a prequel film about a young Morpheus or a sequel film from a descendant of his. In March 2018, Penn said he was working on a revival of the franchise and teased the possibility of an expanded universe. Penn clarified in October 2019 that he had been working on one of two Matrix projects at Warner Bros., and that his work was separate from the planned film. Penn's film did not go ahead in favor of Wachowski's film; Jada Pinkett Smith later reflected that handing the franchise's legacy to other filmmakers would have been a "horrendous mistake".

Pre-production

As explained by Lana Wachowski during the Berlin International Literature Festival 2021, Warner Bros. constantly approached the Wachowskis every year to make another Matrix sequel, but the Wachowskis always declined the offers out of a lack of interest and because of their feelings that the trilogy's story had concluded. However, in 2019, Ron and Lynne Wachowski, the Wachowskis' parents, died alongside a close friend of Lana's, with her father passing away first, her friend second and her mother third. After not being able to process that kind of grief, Lana suddenly conceived the story of The Matrix Resurrections one sleepless night. In her words, Wachowski felt that while she could not have her parents back, she then could have Neo and Trinity back, feeling very comforted to see them alive again. With Lana Wachowski stepping forward for a sequel, Warner Bros. readily accepted her concept, eager to have the franchise's creator aboard for the sequel, according to McTeigue.

The film was officially announced by Warner Bros. on August 20, 2019. Lana Wachowski returned as sole director, with Reeves and Carrie-Anne Moss confirmed to reprise their roles. The script was written by Wachowski, David Mitchell, and Aleksandar Hemon, who had previously written the series finale of Sense8 together. The Wachowskis also previously directed the 2012 film adaptation of Mitchell's novel Cloud Atlas. Lilly Wachowski was not involved with the film due to work on the Showtime series Work in Progress, but gave her blessing to those involved to come up with a story even "better than the original". She said she needed time away from the industry to "reconnect with myself as an artist and I did that by going back to school and painting and stuff", and that she had been affected by the death of her parents. John Toll was hired as cinematographer that month. Toll was cinematographer on the Wachowskis' previous films Cloud Atlas and Jupiter Ascending, as well as every episode of Sense8.

Casting
Reeves and Moss were confirmed to be reprising their roles as Neo and Trinity upon the film's announcement in August 2019. In October 2019, Yahya Abdul-Mateen II was cast in the film, with some sources speculating he would be playing a young Morpheus, while Neil Patrick Harris was added in an undisclosed role. Following the first trailer's release, Abdul-Mateen II confirmed that he was indeed playing the role of Morpheus. Laurence Fishburne, who portrayed Morpheus in the original trilogy, announced in August 2020 that he was not asked to reprise his role as Morpheus. Pinkett Smith entered negotiations to reprise her role as Niobe, with Jessica Henwick entering negotiations to join in an undisclosed role, later revealed as Bugs. Henwick was being considered by The Walt Disney Company to audition for a role in Shang-Chi and the Legend of the Ten Rings (2021) at the same time she was offered to audition for the part of Bugs; in what she described a "red-pill/blue-pill moment" for her, Henwick chose Resurrections over Shang-Chi. Jada Pinkett-Smith and Jessica Henwick were confirmed in December, along with the additions of Jonathan Groff and Toby Onwumere; Pinkett-Smith was convinced to return after learning from Wachowski how much the film meant for her. They went through a "couple different versions" for Niobe until they settled to depict the character in an elderly form.

In January 2020, Eréndira Ibarra was cast, with Priyanka Chopra entering final negotiations. That same month, Lambert Wilson, who played the Merovingian in the sequels, revealed he was in negotiations to return. Hugo Weaving, who starred in the franchise as Agent Smith, was originally approached to reprise his role, but he had scheduling conflicts with his involvement in Tony Kushner's theatrical adaptation of The Visit, leading Wachowski to conclude that the dates would not work after staying in touch with Weaving for a while. Weaving was later confirmed to be appearing in the film, but through archive footage from the original trilogy, while Groff was confirmed to have been cast as Smith in December 2021, replacing Weaving. Chopra and Wilson's castings were confirmed in February 2020, along with the additions of Andrew Caldwell, Brian J. Smith and Ellen Hollman. After some speculation, Chopra was revealed to be playing Sati in the film; the character was previously portrayed by Tanveer K. Atwal in Revolutions.

Joe Pantoliano, who appeared in the first film as Cypher, expressed interest in April 2020 in reprising his role despite his character's death in the first installment and messaged Lana Wachowski about the possibility of bringing him back, but received no response from her. In September 2020, it was announced Daniel Bernhardt was reprising his role as Agent Johnson from The Matrix Reloaded (2003). Christina Ricci was announced as part of the cast in June 2021; she had previously worked with the Wachowskis on Speed Racer (2008). Telma Hopkins was also announced to be part of the cast in September 2021. In December 2021, less than a week before the film's premiere, Henwick confirmed to have filmed a scene with a background cameo appearance of Tom Hardy, as Venom: Let There Be Carnage (2021) was being filmed simultaneously with Resurrections, though it is currently unclear if Hardy's appearance was kept in the finished film. After the film's Toronto premiere, it was confirmed that Chad Stahelski, who served a stunt coordinator in the previous films, appeared in the film as "Handsome Chad".

Filming

Unlike the previous films, which were shot predominantly in Australia, The Matrix Resurrections was filmed in the United States and Europe.

Under the code name "Project Ice Cream", the film began production in San Francisco on February 4, 2020. Filming also took place in Chicago. Filming in San Francisco caused irritation amongst residents and city workers after damage was inflicted to buildings and street lights. As in the case of other productions like Shang-Chi and the Legend of the Ten Rings and Venom: Let There Be Carnage, the producers had to pay $420,000 to the San Francisco Police Department so they could film in the city. As opposed to other productions, no second unit was needed during the action sequences as Wachowski directed all the scenes herself. Scott Rogers, a stunt performer who worked with Reeves in John Wick: Chapter 3 – Parabellum (2019) and John Wick: Chapter 4 (2023), was hired to be the film's stunt coordinator.

In March 2020, the production relocated to Studio Babelsberg in Potsdam, Germany. On March 16, 2020, production on the film was suspended due to the COVID-19 pandemic. After filming was halted, Wachowski contemplated the possibility of never finishing the film and letting it "go down as an incomplete legendary film not meant to be seen by anyone". However, the cast insisted Wachowski return and finish the film until she agreed. On August 16, 2020, Reeves confirmed filming had resumed in Berlin. Principal photography wrapped on November 11, 2020.

Wachowski's long-time camera operator, Daniele Massaccesi, took over as director of photography in the latter part of filming after original DoP John Toll left due to a health issue in his family.

The dialogue editing, sound mixing, sound design and sound editing with director Lana Wachowski took place in spring 2021 at the Babelsberg-based post-production company Rotor Film. Visual effects that allow space and time to appear offset on the screen were created with camera systems specially developed for Matrix Resurrections during outdoor shooting and in the volumetric studio called Volucap in Babelsberg as well as in the world's first volumetric underwater studio on the Babelsberg film studio premises. Volucap, a cooperation between Studio Babelsberg, Fraunhofer Society and UFA, worked on site for two years on Matrix Resurrections.

After finishing work on Matrix Resurrections, the co-producing Studio Babelsberg fitted its largest film studio (Stage 20) with rainbow colors and named it "Rainbow Stage" in honor of the Wachowskis. The Wachowskis, known for their commitment to people of diverse sexual orientations and identities, had previously directed several times in Babelsberg including, e.g., V for Vendetta and Cloud Atlas.

 Music 

In September 2021, Warner Bros. confirmed that Johnny Klimek and Tom Tykwer would be scoring the film, having previously collaborated with Wachowski on Sense8 and Cloud Atlas, replacing Don Davis, who composed the score for the first three films. The 1967 song "White Rabbit" by Jefferson Airplane is prominently featured in the trailer and film. Wachowski said the choice of "White Rabbit" for the trailer not only was in reference to elements of Lewis Carroll's 1865 novel Alice's Adventures in Wonderland that The Matrix had previously used and which "White Rabbit" is based on, but also a nod to Jefferson Airplane themselves which was formed as a house band for The Matrix club in San Francisco. The second trailer featured an electronic/orchestral cover of the Rage Against the Machine song "Wake Up" by Sebastian Böhm. The original song featured prominently at the end of the first Matrix film, and Resurrections features in its ending a cover by Brass Against.

The film's score was released on December 17, 2021. A track from the album titled "Neo and Trinity Theme (Johnny Klimek & Tom Tykwer Exomorph Remix)" was released as a single on December 10.

Marketing

On August 24, 2021, the title was revealed as The Matrix Resurrections. A trailer was screened as part of Warner Bros.' panel at CinemaCon that day, featuring a meeting between Neo and Trinity. Ahead of the film's first official trailer being released on September 9, the movie's official website was updated on September 7, presenting random clips of the trailer to the user and narration based on their time of day. A second trailer was released on December 6, 2021. By its opening weekend in the U.S. and Canada, the film had made 600.6 million impressions across Facebook, Twitter, Instagram, and YouTube, in part due to the exponential growth of HBO Max in 2021. According to RelishMix, "these stats run 2X over the norm for the genre as far as awareness and reach."

A tie-in interactive tech demo titled The Matrix Awakens: An Unreal Engine 5 Experience, based on Unreal Engine 5, was released by Epic Games for PlayStation 5 and Xbox Series X/S during The Game Awards 2021.

Release
Theatrical and streamingThe Matrix Resurrections held its world premiere in the United States at the Castro Theater in San Francisco on December 18, 2021. The film was initially set for release on May 21, 2021, which would have premiered alongside John Wick: Chapter 4 also starring Keanu Reeves. However, the film was postponed to April 1, 2022, due to the COVID-19 pandemic. The film was then moved forward to December 22, 2021. It is the final film from Warner Bros. Pictures to have a simultaneous 30-day release on the HBO Max streaming service, which was used in response to the COVID-19 pandemic.

According to Samba TV, the film was streamed in 2.8 million households over its first five days of release. Over the same period, it received the most unauthorized downloads of any feature, making up 32.6% of torrents. 3.2 million households had streamed it on HBO Max within its first week of release according to Samba TV. The film was released in China on January 14, 2022.

Home media
The film was released digitally on January 25, 2022, and on Blu-ray, DVD and Ultra HD Blu-Ray on March 8. The retail versions includes bonus content including behind-the-scenes featurettes.

 Reception 
 Box office The Matrix Resurrections grossed $40.4million in the United States and Canada, and $118.7million in other territories for a worldwide total of $159.1 million against a budget of $190 million, making the film a box-office bomb.

In the United States and Canada, the film was released alongside Sing 2 and The King's Man, and was projected to gross around $40 million from 3,552 theaters over its first five days of release, with some tracking reaching as high as $70 million. However, the film ended up underperforming at the box office, grossing $10.75 million over the weekend for a five-day total of $21.2 million, finishing third behind Spider-Man: No Way Home and Sing 2. The total was lower than the $16.7 million made by Warner Bros.' Wonder Woman 1984 the previous Christmas in just 2,151 theaters, and was blamed in part on the simultaneous HBO Max release, lackluster audience reactions, and Christmas falling on a Saturday. In its second weekend, the film finished fifth at the box office with $3.8 million. In its third, the film earned $1.8 million and finished sixth. In its fourth weekend, the film finished tenth at the box office with $803,606.

The film debuted second in Russia ($3.9 million), first in Japan ($3.9 million), and first in Thailand ($794,000). Its opening gross was 8% above Eternals (2021) and 12% over Tenet (2020). The film went on to earn $35.2 million in its second weekend, $13.7 million in its third, and $7.7 million in its fourth. In its fifth weekend, the film crossed the $100 million mark outside the U.S. and Canada. The film made $3.5 million in its sixth weekend, and $2.1 million in its seventh.

In February 2022, co-financiers Village Roadshow sued Warner Bros. for breach of contract, claiming that the decision to stream The Matrix Resurrections on HBO Max created "abysmal theatrical box office sales figures" and damaged value of the Matrix franchise. Warner Bros. responded that the lawsuit was "a frivolous attempt by Village Roadshow to avoid their contractual commitment".

 Critical response 
The site's critics consensus reads: "If it lacks the original's bracingly original craft, The Matrix Resurrections revisits the world of the franchise with wit, a timely perspective, and heart." On Metacritic, the film has a weighted average score of 63 out of 100, based on 57 critics, indicating "generally favorable reviews". Audiences polled by CinemaScore gave the film an average grade of "B−" on an A+ to F scale, the lowest of the series, while PostTrak reported 60% of audience members gave it a positive score, with 46% saying they would definitely recommend it.Los Angeles Times reported a mixed reception and divided reactions to the film. Film critic Katie Walsh praised the film, concluding "Wachowski brings this unapologetic earnestness and sense of pleasure to The Matrix Resurrections, which is also a welcome reminder that big action films can be well lit, stunningly designed and, yes, colorful too." The Independent gave the film 4 out of 5 and wrote, "The Matrix Resurrections ends with a literal call to the powers of sentimentality, empowerment and freedomit ponders whether humanity finds any value in them which, in turn, seems to really ask whether audiences still have any interest in blockbusters of this purity and ambition. For my own stake, at least, I hope they do." Gizmodo praised the film, saying "Resurrections is an excellent Matrix sequel that knows what you think you want in a Matrix sequel, and gives it to you in ways you aren't expecting. Sometimes those things don't work, but mostly they do, and as a result I'm confident to say: The Matrix is back." Matt Singer of ScreenCrush wrote, "The thing that carries The Matrix Resurrections through some of those rough patches instead is Wachowski's obvious affection for the characters, and the actors' reciprocal love for this world and its endless intellectual curiosities."The Guardian gave the film 2 out of 5 and wrote: "Really, Resurrections doesn't do much to remove the anticlimax that hung like a cloud over the cinema auditorium at the end of the third film in 2003. This movie is set up to initiate a possible new series, but there is no real creative life in it. Where the original film was explosively innovatory, this is just another piece of IP, an algorithm of unoriginality." The Verge also gave the film a negative review praising the performances and visuals but criticized the writing, characterization and recasting of characters and felt that "Resurrection centers Neo and Trinity's love story but in a disjointed and frustrating way." The Times called it "another truly horrible sequel" in a one-star review, criticizing what it called its creative shallowness, similarity to previous Matrix films, level of self-referentiality, and the quality of its action sequences. Gulf News gave the film a mixed review, concluding that "The Matrix Resurrections may be a bumpy ride but it's still a trip." IGNs Amelia Emberwing gave the film 4 out of 10, praising the performances but criticizing the execution and visuals while also writing "The Matrix Resurrections is the kind of film that will go down in cult history because it is so laughably bad. Truthfully, I can't even say it's unenjoyable because I spent so much of its overly long runtime giggling over how jaw-droppingly misguided the majority of it is", and further expressed, "The Matrix Resurrections is a bunch of really good ideas stacked together to make a badand sometimes uglyfilm."

 Accolades 

Future
Following the film's release, producer James McTeigue told Collider that there were no plans for further Matrix'' films, though he believed that the film's open ending meant that this could change in the future: "I think the film also works where it's really open to audience interpretation, like what happened in those 60 years before they fished Neo out again, or Thomas Anderson to Neo. When Neo and Trinity are there at the end, and they're talking with The Analyst, what do they actually mean that they're going to change? So I think that it's out there, but it's not in our wheelhouse at the moment."

Notes

References

External links

2021 films
2020s English-language films
2021 science fiction action films
2020s science fiction thriller films
American science fiction action films
American science fiction thriller films
American sequel films
Animal Logic films
Cyberpunk films
Metafictional works
Drone films
Film productions suspended due to the COVID-19 pandemic
Films about rebellions
Films about telepresence
Films directed by The Wachowskis
Films postponed due to the COVID-19 pandemic
Films scored by Johnny Klimek
Films scored by Tom Tykwer
Films set in Japan
Films set in San Francisco
Films shot in Berlin
Films shot in Chicago
Films shot in San Francisco
Films with screenplays by The Wachowskis
Gun fu films
IMAX films
HBO Max films
Kung fu films
Martial arts science fiction films
The Matrix (franchise) films
Transgender-related films
Self-reflexive films
Village Roadshow Pictures films
Warner Bros. films
2020s American films